Queen Margaret Hospital is a hospital located in the town of Dunfermline in Fife, Scotland. It is managed by NHS Fife.

History
The hospital was commissioned to replace the Milesmark Hospital, the Dunfermline and West Fife District Hospital and the Dunfermline Maternity Hospital. The first phase of the new hospital, which excluded maternity services, opened in 1985. The second phase was completed in 1993 and the new facilities were officially opened by the Princess Royal later that year.

From January 2012, all of Fife's accident and emergency services were located at the Victoria Hospital in Kirkcaldy. In 2014 improvements were made to the reception area aimed at making the area more welcoming.

Services
The hospital provides breast surgery, ophthalmology, dermatology and day surgery services.

Public transport
Various Stagecoach East Scotland bus services stop at the hospital. A railway station is within a ten-minute walk of the hospital.

Radio West Fife

Radio West Fife is the current hospital radio service broadcasting to Queen Margaret Hospital.

References

External links 

  
 Healthcare Improvement Scotland inspection reports

NHS Fife
Hospital buildings completed in 1985
Hospital buildings completed in 1993
Buildings and structures in Dunfermline
NHS Scotland hospitals
Hospitals in Fife
Hospitals established in 1985
1985 establishments in Scotland